Polybius was a 2nd-century Christian bishop of Tralles mentioned in the writings of Ignatius of Antioch in his Epistle to the Trallians where is described as grave in demeanour and having a gentleness which commanded respect. Polybius visited Ignatius at Smyrna while the latter was on his way to martyrdom in Rome.

2nd-century bishops in Roman Anatolia
History of Aydın Province